Skedsmo FK is a Norwegian football club from Skedsmokorset. It was founded in 1980, when the multi-sports club Skedsmo IF was split into several entities. The club colors are red and white.

The men's team currently resides in the Third Division (fourth tier), having previously won two promotions in a row. Notable former players include Torgeir Bjarmann, who spent his younger days in the club before joining Lillestrøm ahead of the 1988 season.

The women's football team last played in the Toppserien in 1991. One profiled player was Elin Krokan, and Tom Nordlie coached the team for a period. Skedsmo FK has not fielded a senior team for women since the 1993 season.

Recent history 
{|class="wikitable"
|-bgcolor="#efefef"
! Season
! 
! Pos.
! Pl.
! W
! D
! L
! GS
! GA
! P
!Cup
!Notes
|-
|2009
|3. divisjon
|align=right |4
|align=right|26||align=right|15||align=right|3||align=right|8
|align=right|81||align=right|51||align=right|48
||First qualifying round
|
|-
|2010
|3. divisjon
|align=right |6
|align=right|26||align=right|13||align=right|5||align=right|8
|align=right|68||align=right|48||align=right|44
||First qualifying round
|
|-
|2011
|3. divisjon
|align=right |5
|align=right|26||align=right|13||align=right|6||align=right|7
|align=right|57||align=right|40||align=right|45
||First round
|
|-
|2012 
|3. divisjon
|align=right bgcolor=#DDFFDD| 1
|align=right|26||align=right|22||align=right|2||align=right|4
|align=right|92||align=right|35||align=right|62
||First qualifying round
|Promoted to the 2. divisjon
|-
|2013
|2. divisjon
|align=right bgcolor="#FFCCCC"| 13
|align=right|26||align=right|5||align=right|6||align=right|15
|align=right|32||align=right|68||align=right|21
|First round
|Relegated to the 3. divisjon
|}

References

External links
Official site
 Skedsmo Stadion - Nordic Stadiums

Football clubs in Norway
Association football clubs established in 1980
Sport in Skedsmo
1980 establishments in Norway